The Judicial District of Lima is one of the 28 Judicial Districts of the Judicial System of Peru. 

Its main seat is in the city of Lima and its jurisdiction extends to 35 of the 43 Districts of Lima. The remaining eight districts (Independencia, San Martín de Porres, Comas, Los Olivos, Puente Piedra, Ancón, Santa Rosa, and Carabayllo) are under jurisdiction of the Judicial District of Cono Norte. Its jurisdiction not only covers part of the Lima Province but also the Huarochirí Province in the Lima Region.

It was created by the decree of August 4, 1824 and was established December 22, 1824 under the presidency of Simón Bolívar. It is the Judicial District with the most operations in the whole nation.

Courts
33 Superior Courts of Justice
8 Civil law courts
2 Family law courts
1 Commercial law courts
6 Labor law courts
16 Criminal law courts
229  Courts of First Instance
89 Civil law courts
21 Family law courts
6 Commercial law courts
29 Labor law courts
69 Criminal law courts
15 Mixed Courts
153 Courts of Peace

See also
Judicial System of Peru

References

Lima